William Fenton is the name of:

William M. Fenton (1808–1871), American politician from Michigan 
William N. Fenton (1908–2005), anthropologist
William Robert Fenton (1923–2013), New Zealand politician 
William Fenton (cricketer) (born 1943), New Zealand cricketer
Billy Fenton (1926–1973), English footballer